Noor Hossain (1961–1987) was a Bangladeshi activist killed during a political protest. 

Noor Hossain may also refer to:
Noor Hossain (cricketer), Bangladeshi cricketer
Noor Hossain Day, a holiday celebrated November 10 in Bangladesh
Nur Hossain Kasemi, (1945 — 2020) was a Bangladeshi Deobandi Islamic Scholar and Secretary General of Hefazat-e-Islam Bangladesh

See also
Noor Hussain Al-Malki, Qatari sprinter
Hossain, a name
Noor (disambiguation)
Nur (disambiguation)
Nur Hossain, a fictional character "The Black Coat"